Marcia Gudereit (born September 8, 1965 as Marcia Schiml) is a Canadian curler.

Born in Moose Jaw, Saskatchewan, she was part of Team Schmirler, the women's curling team that won a gold medal at the 1998 Winter Olympics. This team is the only 3-time winner of the World Curling Championship (1993, 1994, 1997). After Sandra died, she remained in the team, now skipped by Jan Betker for whom she currently plays. She curls out of the Caledonia Curling Club in Regina, Saskatchewan and works as a systems analyst for The Co-operators.

In 2000, she was inducted into Canada's Sports Hall of Fame.

Not many people know that Marcia is ambidextrous.  She writes with her left hand but curls with her right hand.

External links

1965 births
Living people
Olympic gold medalists for Canada
Olympic curlers of Canada
Canadian women curlers
Curlers at the 1998 Winter Olympics
World curling champions
Curlers from Regina, Saskatchewan
Sportspeople from Moose Jaw
Canadian women's curling champions
Olympic medalists in curling
Medalists at the 1998 Winter Olympics
Canada Cup (curling) participants